Mexcala meridiana is a jumping spider  species in the genus Mexcala that lives in South Africa. It was first described by Wanda Wesołowska in 2009.

References

Endemic fauna of South Africa
Salticidae
Spiders of South Africa
Spiders described in 2009
Taxa named by Wanda Wesołowska